This is a list of Spanish television related events from 2013.

Events
 2 January - New TV Channel, Nueve is launched.
 11 January - Strike action in Telemadrid comes to an end after 28 days.
 22 March - After the Supreme Court of Spain Decision of 27 November 2012, The Government withdraws 9 operating licences to Media Companies: 2 to Mediaset España, 3 to Atresmedia, 2 to Net TV and 2 to Veo Televisión S. A.
 26 March - Broadcasting of the 2014 FIFA World Cup qualification football match Spain-France in Telecinco, gets 10,5 millones viewers (52,5% share).
30 June TV Channel Cartoon Network España shuts down.
 6 November - Regional TV channel Canal Nou is shut down by the Government of Valencian Community.
 19 December - TV Channel Teledeporte HD is launched.
 31 December -  La 1 starts broadcasting in High-definition television.

Debuts

Television shows

Ending this year

Changes of network affiliation

Deaths
 17 January - Fernando Guillén, actor, 80.
 5 February - Joan Dalmau, actor, 85.
 3 March - José Sancho, actor, 68.
 19 March - José Félix Pons, Sport journalist, 80.
 3 April - Mariví Bilbao, actress, 83.
 17 April - Ángel Alcázar, actor, 57.
 9 May - Alfredo Landa, actor, 80.
 12 May - Constantino Romero, host and voice actor, 65.
 23 May - Tate Montoya, singer, composer and host, 64.
 13 June - Xosé Manuel Olveira, actor, 58.
 10 July - Concha García Campoy, journalist, 54.
 24 July
 Carla Revuelta, director and producer, 38.
 Enrique Beotas, journalist, 58.
 21 August - Jorge Horacio Fernández, director, 62.
 23 August - Álvaro Bultó, host, 51.
 27 August - Julia Trujillo, actress, 81.
 30 August - Manuel Martín Ferrand, journalist and director of Antena 3, 72.
 1 September - Manuel Andrés, actor, 83.
 24 October - Manolo Escobar, singer and host, 82.
 25 October - Amparo Soler Leal, actress, 80.
 7 November - Amparo Rivelles, actress, 88.
 3 December - Fernando Argenta, musician and host, 68.
 19 December - Ana María Saizar, voice actress, 89.
 27 December - Elvira Quintillá, actress, 85.

See also
 2013 in Spain
 List of Spanish films of 2013

References